Follow the City Lights is the sixth album by Spanish rock band Dover. In contrast to previous releases, the album has an electronic character.

Cristina Llanos, Amparo Llanos and programmer and drummer Jesús Antúnez were joined by Samuel Titos, a newly signed bassist for the band. Daniel Alcover, with whom they had already worked with on Devil Came to Me, mastered the album and later won a Music Prize for Best Sound Technician for the album.

The music style shift led to the resignation of some fans. The album reached No. 1 in Spanish sales for several weeks and their first single "Let Me Out" reached the top of the charts. The album won the Best Alternative Album award at the Music Awards 2006. It was followed by the singles "Do Ya" and "Keep On Moving".

The song "Do Ya" is featured in the soundtrack of football video game FIFA 08.

Track listing 
Lyrics and music by Amparo Llanos and Cristina Llanos.

Personnel 
Dover
 Cristina Llanos – vocals and acoustic guitar
 Amparo Llanos – guitar
 Jesús Antúnez – drums
 Samuel Titos – bass guitar

Accolades

Charts

References

External links 
 

2006 albums
Dover (band) albums